The Eternal Mask (German: Die ewige Maske) is a 1935 Austrian-Swiss drama film directed by Werner Hochbaum and starring Peter Petersen, Mathias Wieman and Franz Schafheitlin. The film was amongst the best ten foreign films of the year judged by the 1937 American National Board of Review of Motion Pictures. It also ran in competition at the 3rd Venice International Film Festival.

Cast
  Peter Petersen as Professor Tscherko 
 Mathias Wieman as Dr. Dumartin 
 Franz Schafheitlin as Monsieur Negar 
 Tom Kraa as Dr. Wendt 
 Thekla Ahrens as Sister Anna 
 Olga Tschechowa as Madame Negar 
 Karl Skraup as Le gardien

Bibliography
 Bergfelder, Tim & Bock, Hans-Michael. The Concise Cinegraph: Encyclopedia of German Cinema. Berghahn Books, 2009.
 Kreimeier, Klaus. The Ufa story: a history of Germany's greatest film company, 1918-1945''. University of California Press, 1999.

External links

1935 films
1935 drama films
Austrian drama films
Swiss drama films
1930s German-language films
Films directed by Werner Hochbaum
Films based on Swiss novels
Medical-themed films
Austrian black-and-white films
Swiss black-and-white films